This is a list of the families of the order Diptera (true flies). The classification is based largely on Pape et al. (2011). Many of the fossil species are of uncertain placement and are retained in separate lists broadly under Nematocera and Brachycera.

Nematocera

Infraorder Deuterophlebiomorpha 
Deuterophlebiidae Edwards, 1922

Infraorder Nymphomyiomorpha 
Nymphomyiidae Tokunaga, 1932

Infraorder Tipulomorpha 
Tipulidae Latreille, 1802 
Cylindrotomidae Schiner, 1863 
Trichoceridae Rondani, 1841 Synonym: Petauristidae.
Pediciidae Osten-Sacken, 1859 
Limoniidae Rondani, 1856

Infraorder Ptychopteromorpha   
Ptychopteridae Osten-Sacken, 1862 Synonyms: Liriopeidae, Liriopidae.

Infraorder Psychodomorpha  
Blephariceridae Loew, 1861 Synonym: Blepharoceridae.
Psychodidae Newman, 1834 Synonyms: Nemopalpidae, Phlebotomidae, Trichomyiidae.
Tanyderidae Osten-Sacken, 1880 Synonym: Macrochilidae.

Infraorder Culicomorpha  
Dixidae Schiner, 1868
Corethrellidae Edwards, 1932 
Chaoboridae Newman, 1834 Synonyms: Corethridae, Chironomapteridae, Mesotendipedidae, Dixamimidae, Rhaetomyiidae.
Culicidae Meigen, 1818
Thaumaleidae Bezzi, 1913 Synonym: Orphnephilidae.
Simuliidae Newman, 1834 Synonyms: Melusinidae.
Ceratopogonidae Newman, 1834 Synonyms: Leptoconopidae, Helidae, Heleidae.
Chironomidae Newman, 1834 Synonym: Tendipedidae

Infraorder Perissommatomorpha  
Perissommatidae Colless, 1962

Infraorder Bibionomorpha    
Anisopodidae Knab, 1912 Synonyms: Phryneidae, Rhyphidae, Sylvicolidae, Mycetobiidae, Protolbiogastridae.
Canthyloscelididae Enderlein, 1912 Synonyms: Hyperoscelididae, Synneuridae.
Scatopsidae Newman, 1834
Axymyiidae Shannon, 1921
Hesperinidae Schiner, 1864 
Bibionidae Fleming, 1821 Synonyms: Penthetriidae, Pleciidae.
Pachyneuridae Schiner, 1864 Synonym: Cramptonomyiidae.
Ditomyiidae Kylin, 1919
Diadocidiidae Winnertz, 1863 
Mycetophilidae Newman, 1834 Synonyms: Fungivoridae, Allactoneuridae, Manotidae
Bolitophilidae Winnertz, 1863 Synonym: Bolitophilinae.
Keroplatidae Rondani, 1856 Synonyms: Ceroplatidae, Zelmiridae, Platyuridae, Zelmicidae, Macroceratidae, Macroceridae, Necromyzidae
Lygistorrhinidae Edwards, 1925 
Rangomaramidae Jaschhof & Didham, 2002 
Sciaridae Billberg, 1820 Synonym: Lycoriidae.
Cecidomyiidae Newman, 1835 Synonyms: Porricondylidae, Itonididae, Heteropezidae, Lestremiidae, Campylomyzidae.

Nematocera families known only as fossils
Ansorgiidae Krzemiñski & Lukashevich, 1993.
Antefungivoridae Rohdendorf, 1938. Synonyms: Antiquamediidae, Pleciomimidae, Sinemediidae.
Architendipedidae
Archizelmiridae Rohdendorf, 1962.
Asiochaoboridae Hong & Wang, 1990. 
Boholdoyidae Kovalev, 1985.
Cascopleciidae
Crosaphididae Kovalev, 1983.
Elliidae Krzeminska, Blagoderov & Krezmiñski, 1993.
Eoditomyiidae Ansorge, 1996.
Eopleciidae.
Eopolyneuridae Rohdendorf, 1962.
Eoptychopteridae.
Gracilitipulidae.
Grauvogeliidae Krzemiñski, 1999.
Hennigmatidae Shcherbakov, 1995.
Heterorhyphidae Ansorge & Krzemiñski, 1995.
Hyperpolyneuridae. Rohdendorf, 1962 
Limnorhyphidae.
Luanpingitidae Zhang, 1986.
Mesophantasmatidae.
Mesosciophilidae Rohdendorf, 1946.
Musidoromimidae.
Nadipteridae Lukashevich, 1995.
Oligophrynidae.
Oreodomyiidae.
Palaeophoridae Rohdendorf, 1951. Synonym: Sciadoceridae
Parapleciidae.
Paraxymyiidae Rohdendorf, 1946.
Pleciodictyidae.
Pleciofungivoridae Rohdendorf, 1946. Synonym: Fungivoritinae
Procramptonomyiidae Kovalev, 1983.
Protendipedidae Rohdendorf, 1951. Synonym: Prototendipedidae.
Protobibionidae F. M. Carpenter 1992.
Protopleciidae Rohdendorf, 1946. Synonyms: Dyspolyneuridae, Protoligoneuridae. Palaeoplecidae
Protorhyphidae Handlirsch, 1906.
Protoscatopsidae Rohdendorf, 1946.
Serendipidae Evenhuis, 1994. Synonym: Paratendipedidae.
Siberhyphidae Kovalev, 1985.
Sinotendipedidae.
Strashilidae. Synonym: Vosilidae.
Tanyderophrynidae Rohdendorf, 1962. Synonym: Tanyderophryneidae.
Tethepomyiidae Grimaldi & Arillo, 2009 
Tillyardipteridae Lukashevich & Shcherbakov, 1999.
Tipulodictyidae Rohdendorf, 1962.
Tipulopleciidae Rohdendorf, 1962.
Valeseguyidae Amorim & Grimaldi, 2006.
Vladipteridae Shcherbakov, 1995.
Zhangobiidae. Synonyms: Palaeolimnobiidae.

Brachycera

Orthorrhapha   
Nemestrinidae Griffith & Pidgeon, 1832
Acroceridae Leach, 1815 Synonyms: Cyrtidae, Oncodidae, Ogcodidae.
Hilarimorphidae Williston, 1896 
Vermileonidae Williston, 1886 Synonyms: Protobrachyceridae, Protobrachycerontidae.
 Superfamily Asiloidea Latreille, 1802
Bombyliidae Latreille, 1802 Synonyms: Phthiriidae, Systropodidae, Usiidae.
Asilidae Latreille, 1802 Synonym: Leptogastridae.
Mydidae Latreille, 1809 Synonyms: Mydaidae, Mydasidae
Apioceridae Bigot, 1857 
Evocoidae Yeates, Irwin & Wiegmann 2006 
Apsilocephalidae Nagatomi, Saigusa, Nagatomi & Lyneborg, 1991 
Scenopinidae Burmeister, 1835 Synonym: Omphralidae.
Therevidae Newman, 1834 
Mythicomyiidae Synonyms: Cyrtosiidae, Mythicomyiinae.
 Superfamily Rhagionoidea Latreille, 1802 
Austroleptidae Nagatomi, 1982 
Bolbomyiidae Stuckenberg, 2001
Rhagionidae Latreille, 1802 Synonyms: Leptidae, Erinnidae (sensu Evenhuis), Paleostratiomyiidae?
 Superfamily Stratiomyoidea Latreille, 1802 
Pantophthalmidae Bigot, 1886 Synonym: Acanthomeridae.
Stratiomyidae Latreille, 1804
Xylomyidae Verrall, 1901 Synonyms: Xylomyiidae, Solvidae.

Superfamily Tabanoidea Latreille, 1802 
Athericidae Nowicki, 1873 
Oreoleptidae Zloty, Sinclair & Pritchard, 2005 
Pelecorhynchidae Enderlein, 1922 
Tabanidae Latreille, 1802
 Superfamily Xylophagoidea Fallén, 1810 
Xylophagidae Fallén, 1810 Synonyms: Heterostomidae, Exeretonevridae, Exerotonevridae, Erinniidae ?(sensu Schumann), Rachiceridae, Coenomyidae, Coenomyiidae.
 Superfamily Empidoidea Latreille, 1804 
Atelestidae Hennig, 1970 
Dolichopodidae Latreille, 1809 Synonym: Microphoridae 
Empididae Latreille, 1804 Synonym: Empidae.
Homalocnemiidae Collin, 1928 
Hybotidae Macquart, 1823 
Oreogetonidae Chvála, 1976 
Ragadidae Sinclair, 2016
 Superfamily Apystomyioidea Nagatomi & Liu, 1994 
Apystomyiidae Nagatomi & Liu, 1994

Aschiza 
Superfamily Phoroidea Curtis, 1833 
Ironomyiidae McAlpine & Martin, 1966 
Lonchopteridae Macquart, 1823 Synonym: Musidoridae.
Opetiidae Rondani, 1856
Phoridae Curtis, 1833 Synonyms: Termitoxeniidae.
Platypezidae Latreille, 1829 Synonym: Clythiidae.
Superfamily Syrphoidea Latreille, 1802 
Pipunculidae Walker, 1834 Synonyms: Dorylaidae, Dorilaidae.
Syrphidae Latreille, 1802

Schizophora 
Conopidae Latreille, 1802 Synonym: Stylogastridae.

Acalyptratae 
 Superfamily Carnoidea Newman, 1834 
Australimyzidae Griffiths, 1972 
Braulidae Egger, 1853 
Canacidae Jones, 1906 Synonyms: Canaceidae, Tethinidae.
Carnidae Newman, 1834
Chloropidae Rondani, 1856 Synonyms: Siphonellopsidae, Oscinidae.
Inbiomyiidae Buck, 2006 
Milichiidae Schiner, 1862 Synonym: Phyllomyzidae.
 Superfamily Ephydroidea Zetterstedt, 1837 
Camillidae Frey, 1921
Curtonotidae Enderlein, 1914 Synonym: Cyrtonotidae
Diastatidae Hendel, 1917 (including Campichoetidae)
Drosophilidae Rondani, 1856
Ephydridae Zetterstedt, 1837 Synonyms: Risidae, Risiidae.
Mormotomyiidae Austen, 1936
 Superfamily Lauxanioidea Macquart, 1835 
Celyphidae Bigot, 1852
Chamaemyiidae Hendel, 1910 Synonyms: Ochthiphilidae, Ochthiphilidae.
Cremifaniidae McAlpine, 1963
Lauxaniidae Macquart, 1835 Synonym: Sapromyzidae.
 Superfamily Lonchaeoidea
Cryptochetidae Brues & Melander, 1932 
Lonchaeidae Rondani, 1856
 Superfamily Nerioidea Westwood, 1840 
Cypselosomatidae Hendel, 1931 Synonyms: Pseudopomyzidae Frey, 1941
Micropezidae Blanchard, 1840 Synonyms: Calobatidae, Taeniapteridae, Tylidae, Trepidariidae.
Neriidae Westwood, 1840
 Superfamily Opomyzoidea Fallén, 1820 
Acartophthalmidae Czerny, 1928 
Agromyzidae Fallén, 1823 Synonym: Phytomyzidae
Anthomyzidae Czerny, 1903
Asteiidae Rondani, 1856 Synonym: Astiidae.
Aulacigastridae Duda, 1924 Synonyms: Aulacigastreridae.
Clusiidae Handlirsch, 1884 Synonyms: Clusiodidae, Heteroneuridae.
Fergusoninidae Tonnoir, 1937 
Marginidae McAlpine, 1991 
Megamerinidae Hendel, 1913 Synonym: Megameridae.
Neminidae McAlpine, 1983 
Neurochaetidae McAlpine, 1978
Odiniidae Hendel, 1920
Opomyzidae Fallén, 1820 Synonym: Geomyzidae (sensu Evenhuis, 1994)
Periscelididae Oldenberg, 1914 Synonyms: Periscelidae, Stenomicridae.
Teratomyzidae Hennig, 1969 
Xenasteiidae Hardy, 1980 
Superfamily Sciomyzoidea Fallén, 1820 
Coelopidae Hendel, 1910 Synonyms: Phycodromiidae, Pycodromidae.
Dryomyzidae Schiner, 1862
Helcomyzidae Hendel, 1924 
Huttoninidae Steyskal, 1965 
Helosciomyzidae Steyskal, 1965 
Heterocheilidae McAlpine, 1991 
Natalimyzidae Barraclough & McAlpine, 2006
Phaeomyiidae Verbeke, 1950 
Ropalomeridae Schiner, 1868
Sciomyzidae Fallén, 1820 Synonyms: Tetanoceridae.
Sepsidae Walker, 1833 Synonym: Sepsididae.
 Superfamily Sphaeroceroidea Macquart, 1835
Chyromyidae Schiner, 1863 Synonyms: Chiromyiidae, Geomyzidae (part. sensu Schumann, 1965)
Heleomyzidae Westwood, 1840 Synonyms: Helomyzidae, Trixoscelididae, Trichoscelidae, Rhinotoridae, Chiropteraomyzidae.
Heteromyzidae Fallén, 1820 
Nannodastiidae Papp, 1980 
Sphaeroceridae Macquart, 1835 Synonyms: Borboridae, Cypselidae.
 Superfamily Tanypezoidea Rondani, 1856 (7 families) 
Diopsidae Billberg, 1820 Synonyms: Centrioncidae.
Gobryidae McAlpine, 1997 
Nothybidae Frey, 1927
Psilidae Macquart, 1835 
Somatiidae Hendel, 1935
Strongylophthalmyiidae Hendel, 1917
Syringogastridae Prado, 1969
Tanypezidae Rondani, 1856 
 Superfamily Tephritoidea Newman, 1834 
Ctenostylidae Bigot, 1882
Pallopteridae Loew, 1862 Synonym: Eurygnathomyiidae.
Piophilidae Macquart, 1835 Synonyms: Neottiophilidae, Thyreophoridae
Platystomatidae Schiner, 1862 Synonym: Platystomidae.
Pyrgotidae Loew, 1868 
Richardiidae Loew, 1868 
Tephritidae Newman, 1834 Synonyms: Trypetidae, Trupaneidae, Trypaneidae, Tachiniscidae.
Ulidiidae Macquart, 1835 Synonyms: Otitidae, Ortalidae, Pterocallidae.

Calyptratae 
 Superfamily Hippoboscoidea Samouelle, 1819
Glossinidae Theobald, 1903
Hippoboscidae Samouelle, 1819
Nycteribiidae Samouelle (ex Leach), 1819
Streblidae Kolenati, 1863
 Superfamily Muscoidea Latreille, 1802 
Anthomyiidae Robineau-Desvoidy, 1830 
Fanniidae Schnabl & Dziedzicki, 1911
Muscidae Latreille, 1802 Synonyms: Eginiidae
Scathophagidae Robineau-Desvoidy, 1830 Synonyms: Cordyluridae, Scatomyzidae, Scopeumatidae, Cordiluridae.
 Superfamily Oestroidea Leach, 1815 
Calliphoridae Brauer & Bergenstamm, 1889 Synonyms: Mesembrinellidae, Bengaliidae.
Mystacinobiidae Holloway, 1976 
Oestridae Leach, 1815 Synonyms: Cuterebridae, Gasterophilidae, Gastrophilidae, Hypodermatidae.
Rhiniidae Brauer & Bergenstamm, 1889
Rhinophoridae Robineau-Desvoidy, 1863 Synonym: Melanophoridae.
Sarcophagidae Macquart, 1834
Tachinidae Robineau-Desvoidy, 1830 Synonyms: Larvaevoridae, Stackelbergomyiidae.
Ulurumyiidae Michelsen & Pape, 2017

Brachycera families known only as fossils
Alinkidae Krzeminski, 1992
Archisargidae Rohdendorf, 1951
Chimeromyiidae Grimaldi, Cumming & Arillo, 2009.
Cratomyiidae Mazzarolo & Amorim, 2000
Eomyiidae Rohdendorf, 1962.
Eostratiomyiidae Rohdendorf, 1951
Eophlebomyiidae Cockerell, 1925.
Eremochaetidae Ussatchov, 1968.
Hoffeinsmyiidae Michelsen, 2009.
Kovalevisargidae Mostovski, 1997
Orientisargidae Zhang 2012
Palaeostratiomyiidae Rohdendorf, 1938
Proneottiphilidae Hennig, 1969
Prosechamyiidae Blagoderov & Grimaldi, 2007 
Protapioceridae Ren, 1998
Protobrachyceridae Rohdendorf, 1964
Protempididae Ussatchov, 1968.
Protomphralidae Rohdendorf, 1957.
Rhagionemestriidae Ussatchov, 1968
Rhagionempididae Rohdendorf, 1951
Uranorhagionidae Zhang, Yang & Ren, 2010
Zhangsolvidae Nagatomi & Yang, 1998

See also
List of obsolete names in Diptera

References

External links
 Sabrosky's Family Group Names in Diptera
Palaeobiology database
 Diptera families of British Columbia

Sources
Barraclough, D. A. & McAlpine, D. K. 2006. Natalimyzidae, a new African family of acalyptrate flies (Diptera: Schizophora: Sciomyzoidea). African Invertebrates 47: 117-134. 
Evenhuis, N.L. (1994): Catalogue of the Fossil Flies of the world (Insecta: Diptera). - Leiden: Backhuys Publ.: 600 pp.
Evenhuis, N.L. (1996): Catalogue of the Diptera of the Australasien and Oceanian Regions. - 
Evenhuis, N.L. (1996): Catalogue of the fossil flies of the world. - 
Jacobs, W. & Renner, M (1988): Biologie und Ökologie der Insekten, 2.Aufl.. - Stuttgart: Fischer: 690 pp.
Maddison, D.R. Tree of life: phylogeny and systematics of Diptera. - 
Schumann, H. (1992): Systematische Gliederung der Ordnung Diptera mit besonderer Berücksichtigung der in Deutschland vorkommenden Familien. - Dt. Ent. Ztsch. N.F. 39 (1-3): 103-116.
Zhang, Z.-Q. (Ed.) 2011 Animal biodiversity: An outline of higher-level classification and survey of taxonomic richness (Zootaxa 3148). Magnolia Press, Auckland, 237 pp. online here pdf 
Zoological Record. -

Other information

Identifying the families
 
 
Pjotr Oosterbroek, 2006 The european families of the Diptera : identification, diagnosis, biology Utrecht, KNNV 

Families of Diptera found in Baltic Amber

Diptera families